H418ov21.C (short for House 418 of 21st Century) is the second studio album by Finnish black metal band Beherit, released in 1994. The album is the group's first dark ambient recording.

Track listing
All songs written and performed by Marko Laiho.

"The Gate of Inanna" – 4:25
"Tribal Death" – 6:59
"Emotional Ecstasy" – 3:48
"Fish" – 3:22
"21st Century" – 4:00
"Paradise (Part II)" – 3:38
"Mystik Force" – 6:55
"Spirit of the God of Fire" – 3:22
"E-scape" – 3:10

References

1994 albums
Beherit albums